Wish and Switch is a 2012 Hong Kong TVB drama first broadcast on January 3, 2012. It stars Myolie Wu, Johnson Lee, Vincent Wong, Selena Lee and Angela Tong. It is slated to run for 20 episodes.

Wish and Switch is a modern comedy drama about how housewife Fan Suk Heung stumbled upon a website, www.換得樂.com, offering to exchange anything that she wants with something in her possession and how her obsession with the website brings about comedic unforeseen consequences.

Cast

Koo family

Fan family

Wing family

King Lap Group (勁立集團) Fast Food Chain

Other casts

Viewership ratings

References

External links
TVB.com Wish and Switch - Official Website 
K-TVB.net Wish and Switch - 
http://www.换得乐.com/ A website made similarly to the website in Wish and Switch.

TVB dramas
2012 Hong Kong television series debuts
2012 Hong Kong television series endings